Georges Decaux (Gamaches, 14 April 1930 - October 12, 2015) was a French professional road bicycle racer from 1952 to 1956. In 1952, Decaux won a stage in the Tour de France.

Major results

1952
Circuit de la Vallée de la Loire
Tour de France:
Winner stage 15
1954
Circuit de la Vallée de la Loire

External links 

Official Tour de France results for Georges Decaux

French male cyclists
1930 births
2015 deaths
French Tour de France stage winners
Sportspeople from Somme (department)
Cyclists from Hauts-de-France